Tracey "Africa" Norman, aka Tracey Africa, is an American fashion model, and the first African-American trans woman model to achieve prominence in the fashion industry. Originally from Newark, New Jersey, Norman has modeled and been photographed for such publications as Essence, Vogue Italia and Harper's Bazaar India. Norman also had a magazine cover and life story spread in New York Magazine.

Career

Beginnings
In 1975, Norman was discovered after sneaking into a photo shoot with fashion photographer Irving Penn, who photographed her for Italian Vogue. Soon after, she appeared on the box of Clairol’s "Born Beautiful" hair color No. 512, Dark Auburn. She is transgender but kept that under wraps, and landed an exclusive contract with Avon, for a skin care line.  In 1980, while on a photo-shoot with Essence magazine, the assistant to her hairdresser, André Douglas, found out about her birth gender and told the editor, Susan Taylor, who was also on the set.  Due to the outrage and because it was not socially acceptable, her photos were not published and no company would work with her any longer. 

At this time, she decided to move to Paris. There she was able to sign a 6-month contract with Balenciaga. Once that contract ended, Norman found a lack of work in Milan and moved back to New York where she signed with Grace del Marco Agency. This agency didn't give her much work and Norman had accepted that her modeling career was basically over. She ended up taking a job at Show Center, where she performed in a burlesque peep show for trans women. Ever since she has been active in the drag ball community and inducted into the ballroom hall of fame in 2001.

Career revitalization
After a biographical piece was written about Norman in December 2015 by New York Magazine's digital fashion site "The Cut", Clairol reached out to Norman and in 2016 announced that Norman would become the face of their 'Nice 'n Easy Color As Real As You Are' campaign. Clairol global associate brand director Heather Carruthers stated that the company was "honored to bring back Tracey Norman as a woman who no longer has to hide her truth." The campaign focused on the "confidence that comes from embracing what makes you unique and using natural color to express yourself freely." In 2016 Norman and Geena Rocero became the first two openly transgender models to appear on the cover of an edition of Harper’s Bazaar.

Personal life
Norman says the feeling of being different goes back as far as she can remember. In a cover story for New York Magazine she said "it just seemed like I was living in the wrong body. I always felt female." “I’ve always identified as being a woman. It was New York mag and the London Times and Marie Claire that put the word trans and attached it to my name. I understood the publicity for it and the interest that it drummed up, but I made that very clear in every interview that I never identified as trans. I don't have a problem with people using it. I'm just saying that personally, I've never identified with the word trans or being trans. I guess, because of the time difference. And I didn't grow up around gay people. I only had women around me. I watched how they talked, conversed with each other, how they walked, how they sat. I was just enthralled with the femininity of a woman and that's what I wanted to be."For Norman her life at home as well as school was not easy. She had a father who was battling cancer and a family to whom she was afraid to come out. Norman was able to keep her gender identity a secret for a long time. It wasn't until the day that she graduated high school that she gathered the courage to come out to her family—including her mom, which was the hardest according to Norman. Although she was nervous to tell her family, she was relieved when her mother extended her arms for a big hug—she felt safe and at home. Her mother admitted that she had always known.

After coming out to her family, she wanted to start to transition but that wasn't an easy process. She ran into an old classmate who had gone through the same transition. This is when she learned that she could take birth control pills, without the placebo, to become the woman she always was. A little after, she started going to trans clubs and this is where she found a doctor who did under-the-table hormone shots. These shots are what gave her a feminine body, her breasts grew and she started to lose weight. Realizing her feminine identity took slightly longer than it did to come out. It took her a few months after graduation to finally find herself wandering into S. Klein, a department store in Newark where she grew up, and buying her first dress. It wasn't until a full year after her graduation that she felt like she could pass as a woman in broad daylight in public.

In a 2021 interview with the LGBTQ&A podcast, Norman said that she does not identify as a transgender woman, but rather just a woman. It is the media that has put the term "transgender" as her identity.

Further reading 

 A storyline in the show Pose was inspired by an instance of rejection that Tracey Norman experienced by Playboy and The Oprah Winfrey Show.
 Laverne Cox paid tribute to Tracey Africa as well as other Black women, such as Tina Turner and Beyoncé, in the October 2016 issue of Cosmopolitan magazine.
 Black on Both Sides: A Racial History of Trans Identity by C. Riley Snorton (University of Minnesota Press, 2017)
 Carol Jenkins sat down with Tracey Norman for Black America in 2016 to discuss her early career as well as its resurgence.

References

1951 births
Transgender female models
African-American female models
African-American models
Living people
People from Newark, New Jersey
American female models
LGBT African Americans
LGBT people from New Jersey
20th-century African-American women
20th-century African-American people
21st-century African-American women
21st-century African-American people